Shivgarh is a  Nagar Panchayat (Town Panchayat; transl. 'town council') or Notified Area Council (NAC)  in Rae Bareli district, Uttar Pradesh, India. As of 2011, its population is 2,812, in 536 households. It has 6 primary schools and 1 healthcare centre. It hosts a Ramlila festival on Agrahayana Sudi 5-11, which involves a dramatic reenactment of the Ramayana. Vendors bring farm tools, earthenware pots, bamboo baskets, toys, and sweets to sell at the festival. Shivgarh also hosts a market twice per week, on Thursdays and Sundays, which mostly deals in grain and kirana.

The 1961 census recorded Shivgarh (here spelled "Sheogarh") as comprising 4 hamlets, with a total population of 952 people (475 male and 429 female), in 212 households and 175 physical houses. The area of the village was given as 395 acres. It had a hospital with 8 beds for males and 6 for females, and it was run by a local body at the time. The Barkhandi Vidyapeeth in Sheogarh, a higher secondary school founded in 1950, had in 1961 a faculty of 23 teachers (all male) and a student body of 451 males and 8 females. Average attendance of the Ramlila festival was recorded as about 3,000 people, while attendance of the twice-weekly market was about 300.

The 1981 census recorded Shivgarh (here also spelled as "Sheogarh") as having a population of 1,588 people, in 351 households, and having an area of 159.86 hectares.

The most busiest route in this town is Shivgarh Main Market route and best English medium School " M.P. Educational Academy" for students to gain knowledge

Mallu ka purva
Shivgarh CD block has the following 62 villages:

References

Villages in Raebareli district